Highland Records is a defunct record label that was based in California in the 1960s and 1970s owned by Sid Talmadge. They often served as a starting point for young musicians who quickly moved on to other better-known labels such as Motown or Brunswick.

Client list
Joe & the Fantastics
The Kendalls
Dick Michaels and the Hartford Group
Frank Lucas
Rosie and the Originals
The Dee Jayes
The Rumblers
The War-Babies
Frank Wilson
Thee Counts
Jim Gamble
Bobby Montgomery
Mike & the Censations
N'Betweens (Slade) (From Wolverhampton, England/UK) - A Side 'Security'/B Side 'Evil Witchman' Highland 1173 released October 1966 and produced by Kim Fowley
The Explosions aka The Xplosions! (From Compton/Los Angeles, CA) songs written by Lionel J. Bihm Jr., Song - "Animated Heart" (As seen on YouTube)
Bobby Charles Highland #711 Come On.

References

External links
Website

See also
 List of record labels

Defunct record labels of the United States
American country music record labels
Rock record labels